Robert Hamilton McKercher  (born May 6, 1930) is a Canadian lawyer from Saskatoon, Saskatchewan. He served as the national president of the Canadian Bar Association from 1983 to 1984, as well as president of the Law Society of Saskatchewan in 1978.

Early life and education
McKercher was born in Saskatoon, Saskatchewan, the son of Stewart and Etta Marie McKercher. He attended the University of Saskatchewan, graduating with a Bachelor of Arts degree in 1950, and then a Bachelor of Laws degree in 1952. He did post-graduate legal studies at the University of Toronto under Bora Laskin (later Chief Justice of Canada), and then attended Harvard Law School, earning a Master of Laws degree.

Legal career
Returning to Saskatchewan from Harvard, McKercher entered the practice of law with his brother Donald. The firm continues to operate today as McKercher LLP. He carried on an active practice, including acting as counsel to two different government inquiries.  He also acted as counsel for the Saskatchewan Provincial Court Judges Association in a dispute with the government of Saskatchewan over judicial compensation. He eventually appeared in the Supreme Court of Canada on behalf of the Saskatchewan Provincial Court judges in Reference re Remuneration of Judges of the Provincial Court (P.E.I.), the case which established that the constitutional principle of judicial independence requires that issues of judicial compensation must be reviewed by  independent commissions.

McKercher is no longer actively involved in the practice of law, but provides some legal services on a pro bono basis to community organizations. He was appointed Queen's Counsel in 1966.

Service to the legal profession
McKercher has been active in the legal profession.  He served two terms as president of the Saskatchewan Branch of the Canadian Bar Association, from 1966 to 1968.  He also was elected national president of the CBA, serving from 1983 to 1984. He also served as president of the Law Society of Saskatchewan in 1978, the provincial regulatory body for lawyers.

Personal life
McKercher has been married to Peggy McKercher for more than 60 years.  She has been extremely active in Saskatoon community organizations, including serving a term as Chancellor of the University of Saskatchewan.

References 

1930 births
University of Saskatchewan alumni
Harvard Law School alumni
Lawyers in Saskatchewan
Canadian King's Counsel
Canadian Bar Association Presidents
People from Saskatoon
Living people
University of Saskatchewan College of Law alumni